Walker's Point Estate (or the  Bush compound) is the summer retreat of the Bush family, in the town of Kennebunkport, Maine. It lies along the Atlantic Ocean in the northeast United States, on Walker's Point.  The estate served as the Summer White House of George H. W. Bush, the 41st President of the United States.

Walker's Point juts out into the ocean in southern Maine approximately midway between the cities of Portland, Maine, and Portsmouth, New Hampshire. The property was previously known as Point Vesuvius and was home to a Kennebunkport city park called "Damon Park", but has been a Bush retreat for more than a century, starting with Bush's maternal grandfather , George Herbert Walker and David Davis Walker.

History
The estate was purchased in the late 19th century jointly by Bush's great-grandfather David Davis Walker, and his son, St. Louis banker George Herbert "Bert" Walker. Both built mansions on the point in 1902. D. D. Walker's mansion has since been torn down. In 1921, Dorothy Walker and Prescott Bush were married, and Bert Walker built a "bungalow" on the Point and gave it to them as a wedding present. When Bert died in 1953, his son, George Herbert Walker Jr. ("Herbie"), purchased the property from his father's estate. It was not willed to him. Upon the death of Herbie in 1977, the property again went up for sale and was purchased by his nephew, George H. W. Bush. The estate has since remained in the Bush family.

President Bush spent much of his childhood at the Kennebunkport estate. As an adult, Bush, his wife Barbara, and their children George W., Jeb, Marvin, Neil, Dorothy, and Robin spent most summers at the estate. The estate has been a backdrop of family weddings, holidays, and receptions. While at the "Summer White House," Bush hosted world leaders including Margaret Thatcher and Mikhail Gorbachev for informal and private meetings. As a young man, Bush relocated to Houston, Texas; eventually the Bushes maintained a working residence in Tanglewood, where they spent most of their time.

George H. W. wrote of his memories there to Portland Magazine in 1997 after reading the article "Inventing the Campbells". The Campbells were the heirs to the Palm Beach clothing fortune and had a home in the Kennebunks. "I really enjoyed that article about the Campbells by Colin Sargent, July/August 1997). I remember Connie, Babs, and Bill—remember them well and very favorably. Connie was the glamour girl, all right. When she would flash by in that neat little Chris Craft, blonde hair flying, all us little guys, who were madly in love with her—from afar, that is—used to sigh and dream. We would hang around hoping that this the most glamorous of women would give us a ride in that flashy boat. Barbara was a wonderful girl, too. Just my age—so my friends and I were not quite as intimidated by her as we were by the slightly older Connie. Anyway, your story brought back many happy memories ... President George Bush, Houston, Texas"

Bush's son, the 43rd President, George W. Bush, visits with family in Kennebunkport several times a year. His "Summer White House" (also known as the "Western White House") was the Prairie Chapel Ranch near Crawford, Texas.

House and grounds
The estate is situated on a promontory of land called Walker's Point which juts out into the Atlantic Ocean. The large central house, built in the New England shingle style, has nine bedrooms, four sitting rooms, an office, a den, a library, a dining room, a kitchen, and various patios and decks. Next to the main house are a four-car garage, a pool, tennis court, dock, boathouse, and guesthouse. There are spacious lawns on either side of the house, on which there is a small sportsfield.

The entrance is gated and guarded by Secret Service officers, though visitors can see the driveway leading up to the main house and a circular driveway, in the middle of which is a large flagpole flying the American flag.  When either presidents Bush were present at the compound while in office, the presidential flag was hoisted below the national colors; the flagpole was a popular backdrop for television journalists during the elder Bush's presidency.

The home and contents were substantially damaged by a strong series of storms in late October 1991. The damage was estimated at $300,000–$400,000. The president did receive an undisclosed amount in flood insurance, but he chose not to take a deduction for storm damage on his 1991 tax return to avoid a conflict of interest as he was the one responsible for declaring Maine as a disaster area.

In 2015, it was reported that Jeb Bush was building a home on Walker's Point.

Notable visitors

World leaders
 French President François Mitterrand visited President George H. W. Bush on May 21, 1989.
 Danish Prime Minister Poul Schlüter visited President George H.W. Bush on August 28, 1989.
 King Hussein of Jordan visited President George H.W. Bush on August 16, 1990. 
 Japanese Prime Minister Toshiki Kaifu visited President George H.W. Bush on July 11, 1991.
 British Prime Minister John Major visited President George H. W. Bush during Soviet talks from August 28–29, 1991.
 Canadian Prime Minister Brian Mulroney visited President George H. W. Bush at Walker's Point multiple times during Bush's presidency:
 August 30–31, 1989. 
 August 27–28, 1990 to discuss the Gulf War. 
 August 26, 1991 during Soviet talks.
 Israeli Prime Minister Yitzhak Rabin visited President George H. W. Bush from August 10–11, 1992.
 Russian President Vladimir Putin visited President George W. Bush in July 2007. Also met with former President George H. W. Bush.
 French President Nicolas Sarkozy visited President George W. Bush on August 11, 2007. Also met with former President George H. W. Bush.
 Former U.S. President Bill Clinton visited during the summer of 2011.

Others 
Billy Graham and his wife Ruth Graham vacationed there with the elder Bushes.
 Former United States Secretary of State Colin Powell was a guest in the Bush compound more than once.
 Retired Lieutenant General William Pagonis has been a guest in the Bush compound more than once.
 Former United States Secretary of State Condoleezza Rice convened the foreign policy advisory team assembled to brief George W. Bush prior to the 2000 U.S. presidential election.
 Supreme Court Justice Clarence Thomas's nomination announcement took place at Walker's Point in July 1991.

See also
 List of residences of presidents of the United States

References

Additional sources

 Bush, George H. W. All the Best
 Kelly, Kitty. Dynasty; the true story of the Bush Family
 George W. Bush White House press reports
 http://news.bbc.co.uk/2/hi/americas/6764809.stm

Bush family residences
Houses in York County, Maine
Presidential homes in the United States
Buildings and structures in Kennebunkport, Maine
1902 establishments in Maine